The Senior Citizens' Park Chapel (Señor Santo Niño Chapel), also known simply as the Santo Niño Chapel, is Roman Catholic chapel at the Senior Citizens' Park in Cebu City, Philippines.

Background
It has a chapel, known as the Senior Citizens' Park Chapel (also known as the Señor Santo Niño Chapel or the Santo Niño Chapel), as its main feature. The chapel opened on April 17, 2022, on Easter Sunday. It was blessed by Cebu Archbishop José S. Palma on the same day.

The facade was inspired from the Santo Niño image's crown and the wavy structure of Terminal 2 of Mactan–Cebu International Airport (MCIA).

The construction of the Santo Niño Chapel is part of a bigger Carbon District modernization project by the Cebu City government and private firm Megawide. The structure was developed by Megawide subsidiary Cebu2World (C2W). Construction began in mid-2021, and the entire Santo Niño sculpture was transported for assembly from Manila to Cebu City on December 14, 2021. Installation of the sculpture was intended to take place prior to the New Year's Day of 2022 but was delayed due to the onslaught of Typhoon Rai (Odette) two days after the arrival of the statue in Cebu. The statue would be installed by February 2022.

References

Roman Catholic chapels in the Philippines
Buildings and structures in Cebu City
Statues of the infant Jesus
Churches completed in 2022